is a very common feminine Japanese given name which can also be used as a surname.

Maki can be written using different kanji characters and can mean (the list is not exhaustive):
as a given name
真貴, "true, precious"
真樹, "true, timber trees"
真紀, "true, chronicle"
真希, "true, hope"
麻紀, "linen, chronicle"
麻貴, "linen, precious"
The given name can also be written in hiragana or katakana.
as a surname
巻, "roll"
槙, "evergreen tree"
槇, "yew plum pine"
牧, "herd"
真木, "true, tree"

People

Given name 
Mākii (マーキー, born 1987), Japanese musician
Maki Arai (麻葵, born 1982), Japanese tennis player
Maki Goto (真希, born 1985), Japanese pop singer
Maki Horikita (真希, born 1988), Japanese actress
Maki Ishii (眞木, 1936–2003), Japanese male composer
, Japanese professional wrestler
Maki Kaji (真起, 1951–2021), Japanese male businessman
Maki Kawamura (真樹), Japanese ballerina
, Japanese voice actress
Maki Meguro (真希, born 1972), Japanese actress
, Japanese swimmer
Maki Miyamae (真樹, born 1973), J-pop singer
Maki Mizuno (真紀, born 1970), Japanese actress
Maki Murakami (真紀), Japanese manga artist
Maki Narumiya (真希, born 1985), Japanese professional wrestler
Maki Nishiyama (茉希, born 1985), Japanese fashion model
Maki Ohguro (摩季, born 1969), Japanese pop singer and songwriter
, Japanese television personality
 (マキ, born 1973), Japanese singer and musician
Maki Sakai (真紀, born 1970), Japanese actress
Maki Tabata (真紀, born 1974), Japanese speed skater
Maki Tsukada (真希, born 1982), Japanese female judoka
Maki Yano (真紀, born 1977), Japanese pop singer
 (真季, born 1996), Japanese television announcer

Surname
Chitose Maki (真木), Japanese illustrator
Fumihiko Maki (槇) (b. 1928), Japanese architect
Fuyukichi Maki (牧), Japanese actor
 (牧), Japanese physicist
Jun Maki (眞木), Japanese copywriter
Karina Maki (巻), Japanese handball player
Kazumi Maki (真木), Japanese theoretical physicist
Seiichiro Maki (巻), Japanese football player
Shinichi Maki (牧), Japanese fencer
Shinji Maki (牧), Japanese comedian
Taichiro Maki (牧), Japanese professional wrestler
Yasuomi Maki (真木), Japanese samurai of the late Edo period
Yōko Maki (actress) (真木), Japanese actress
Yoko Maki (manga artist) (槙), Japanese manga artist
Yoshio Maki (牧), Japanese politician
Yuki Maki (巻), Japanese football player

Non-Japanese people
 Chico Maki (1939–2015)
 Pete Maki
 Tomi Maki (born 1983), Finnish ice hockey player
 Wayne Maki (1944–1973)

Fictional characters

Given name 
Maki Aikawa (相川 摩季), the protagonist in the Air Master series
Maki Genryusai (源柳斉 真紀; マキ), character in Final Fight and Street Fighter video game series
Maki Karii (雁井 真希), an alias Minami Maki uses in Magical Trans!
Maki Katsuragi (桂木 眞己), a main character in Stars Align
Maki Harukawa (春川 魔姫), a character from Danganronpa V3: Killing Harmony
Maki Nikaido, one of the main characters of Death Note film series spin-off L: Change the World
Maki Nishikino (西木野 真姫), character in the Love Live! School Idol Project series
Maki Oze (茉希 尾瀬), a character in Fire Force
Maki Shijo (四条 眞妃), character in the Kaguya-sama series
Maki Zenin (禪院真希), a character from Jujutsu Kaisen

Surname
Kiyoka Maki, the Ultimate Sniper, from Danganronpa Another Despair Academy
Kiyoto Maki (真木 清人), character in the Kamen Rider OOO series
Minami Maki (真木 南), a character from Magical Trans!
Shinichi Maki (牧 紳一), a character from Slam Dunk
Shoko Maki (間木 照子), the alias of Naomi Misora from Death Note

Japanese feminine given names
Japanese unisex given names
Japanese-language surnames